The 1989 FIFA Futsal World Championship was the first ever FIFA Futsal World Championship, the quadrennial international futsal championship contested by the men's national teams of the member associations of FIFA. It was held between 5 and 15 January 1989 in the Netherlands. It was the first non-Olympic FIFA tournament held in the country.

Brazil won the tournament.

Participants

16 countries were invited to participate to the tournament. 6 from Europe, 3 from South America, 2 from North America, Africa and Asia respectively and 1 from Oceania.

Venues
Holland has many hundreds of sports halls. The KNVB's organizing committee has picked five of the largest and most attractive as the venues for the 1st FIFA World Championship for Five-A-Side Football.

Squads

Round 1

Group A

Group B

Group C

Group D

Round 2

Group A

Group B

Final round

Semi-finals

3rd Place

Final

Champions

Awards

Goalscorers
7 goals

 Laszlo Zsadanyi

6 goals

 Rudi Schreurs
 Benatti
 Mihaly Borostyan
 Victor Hermans
 Peter Vermes

5 goals

 Eric Maes
 Raul
 Toca
 Laszlo Rozsa
 Andrea Famà
 Marcel Loosveld
 Jim Gabarra

4 goals

 Juan Ávalos
 Nicolas Hidalgo
 Átila
 Brian Laudrup
 Lars Olsen
 Raoul Albani
 Jose Sanchez

3 goals

 Khaled Lounici
 Alain Fostier
 Nico Papanicolaou
 Marquinhos
 Neimar
 Mario Faber
 Daniel Armora
 Domingo Valencia
 Tab Ramos

2 goals

 Fernando Lozano
 Oscar Crino
 Paul Trimboli
 Adílio
 Dirceu
 John Fitzgerald
 Kurt Joergensen
 Sandor Olajos
 Laszlo Qiriko
 Franco Albanesi
 Paolo Minicucci
 Giovanni Roma
 Tsuyoshi Kitazawa
 Andre Bakker
 Michel Seintner
 Francisco Alcaraz
 Luis Jara
 Mario Ruiz-Diaz
 Safouk Al-Temyat
 Sergio Bonilla
 Antonio Ferre
 José Iglesias
 Eric Eichmann
 Brent Goulet
 Mike Windischmann
 Clayton Munemo
 Herman Beyers

1 goal

 Lakhdar Belloumi
 Abderrahmane Dahnoune
 Ramon Alvarez
 Hugo Castaneira
 Gabriel Valarin
 Alan Davidson
 Žarko Odžakov
 Raf Hernalsteen
 Karel Janssen
 Luc Reul
 Cadinho
 Carlos Alberto
 Gilson
 Eddy Berdusco
 Alex Bunbury
 Tony Nocita
 Peter Sarantopoulos
 Torben Johansen
 Ole Moeller Nielsen
 Janos Mozner
 Paolo de Simoni
 Alfredo Filippini
 Toshinori Yato
 Eduard Demandt
 Jeffrey Foree
 Andre Tielens
 Adolfo Jara
 Omar Espineda
 Luis Flor
 Víctor López
 Khaled Al-Behair
 Abdullah Abu Humoud
 Mario Gonzalez
 Carlos Navarro
 A.J. Lachowecki
 Doc Lawson
 Bruce Murray
 Gyula Visnyei
 Antony Kambani

Tournament ranking

References

External links
FIFA Futsal World Championship Netherlands 1989, FIFA.com
FIFA Technical Report

1989 FIFA Futsal World Championship
FIFA Futsal World Cup
Fifa Futsal World Championship, 1989
1988–89 in Dutch football
International futsal competitions hosted by the Netherlands